Dorothy At Forty was the first single taken from the album Happy Hollow by Cursive.  It was released as a teaser for Happy Hollow on July 11, 2006.  The album track "Dorothy At Forty" is backed with the exclusive non-album tracks "The Bitter End" and "The Censor".  All horn arrangements were done by Nate Walcott.

This single came with a download code to download the songs in MP3 format directly from Saddle Creek Records.

Track listing
 "Dorothy At Forty" – 3:10
 "The Bitter End" – 3:14
 "The Censor" – 2:00

Personnel on "Dorothy At Forty"
 Tim Kasher – vocals, guitar
 Ted Stevens – guitar, vocals
 Matt Maginn – bass
 Clint Schnase – drums
 Mike Mogis - samples and synthesizers
 Nate Walcott - trumpet
 Dean Haist - trumpet
 Nancy Vogt - trombone
 Scott Vicroy - baritone saxophone

Personnel on "The Bitter End"
 Tim Kasher – vocals, guitar, piano, organ
 Ted Stevens – guitar
 Matt Maginn – bass
 Clint Schnase – drums
 Mike Mogis - mellotron
 Nate Walcott - trumpet
 Dean Haist - trumpet
 Nancy Vogt - trombone
 Scott Vicroy - baritone saxophone
 Brian Morrow - tenor saxophone
 John Thomason - tuba

Personnel on "The Censor"
 Tim Kasher – vocals, guitar
 Ted Stevens – guitar, vocals
 Matt Maginn – bass
 Clint Schnase – drums
 Nate Walcott - trumpet, piano
 Dean Haist - trumpet
 Nancy Vogt - trombone
 Scott Vicroy - baritone saxophone
 Brian Morrow - tenor saxophone

References

Cursive (band) songs
2006 EPs
Saddle Creek Records EPs